Suuto Breakor (スートブレイコー) is an album by Osaka-based band Afrirampo, released in 2007. The albums consists of a single 42-minute song, divided into 7 parts on the track listing.

Track listing
 スートブレイコー 1 (6:38)
 スートブレイコー 2 (7:17)
 スートブレイコー 3 (2:13)
 スートブレイコー 4 (7:48)
 スートブレイコー 5 (8:11)
 スートブレイコー 6 (5:48)
 スートブレイコー 7 (4:01)

2007 albums
Afrirampo albums